The winners of the Vancouver Film Critics Circle Award for Best Foreign Language Film are listed below:

Winners and nominees

2000s

2010s

2020s

References

Vancouver Film Critics Circle Awards
Film awards for Best Foreign Language Film
Lists of films by award